Philippe Blasband (born 26 July 1964 in Teheran, Iran) is a filmmaker and a writer in French language from Belgium. He is of Jewish origin and lives in Brussels.

Work

Novels
 De cendres et de fumées, Gallimard (1990) - Prix Rossel
 L'Effet-cathédrale, Gallimard (1994)
 Max et Minnie, Gallimard (1996)
 Le Livre des Rabinovitch, Le Castor Astral (1998)
 Johnny Bruxelles, Grasset (2005)
 Irina Poignet, Le Castor Astral (2008), novel based on the scenario of Irina Palm

Short stories
 Quand j'étais sumo (Le Castor Astral, 2000)

Non-fiction
 Le petit garçon qui parlait dans les cocktails, Climax Editions (2007) - included in DVD edition of La couleur des mots

Films (as writer)

Short films 
 Bon anniversaire, Sergent Bob (de Frédéric Fonteyne)
 les Vloems (1989) (de Frédéric Fonteyne)
 La Ballade de Billie (1989) (de Geneviève Mersch)
 La Modestie (1992) (in Les sept péchés capitaux) (de Frédéric Fonteyne)
 Le courage (1992) (in Les sept péchés capitaux)(de Geneviève Mersch)
 Bob le déplorable (1993) (de Frédéric Fonteyne)
 John (1994) (de Geneviève Mersch)
 Doucement (1997) (de Jacques Decrop)
 La Dinde (1999) (de Sam Garbarski)
 Joyeux Noël Rachid (2000) (de Sam Garbarski)
 La Vie, la Mort et le Foot (2000) (de Sam Garbarski)

Feature films 
 Ellas (1997) (dir. Luís Galvao Teles) : French dialogues
 Max et Bobo (1998) (dir. Frédéric Fonteyne) 
 Abracadabra (1998) (dir. Harry Cleven)co-written with Harry Cleven
 Une liaison pornographique (1999) (dir. Frédéric Fonteyne avec Sergi López et Nathalie Baye)
 Thomas est amoureux (2000) (dir. Pierre-Paul Renders)
 L'amour en suspens (2000) dir. Herman Van Eycken : dialogues
 Deuxième quinzaine de juillet (2000) (dir. Christophe Reichert) co-written with Christophe Reichert
 Le Tango Rashevski (2002) (dir. Sam Garbarski) co-written with Sam Garbarski 
 J'ai toujours voulu être une sainte (2002) (dir. Geneviève Mersch) co-written with Geneviève Mersch and Anne Fournier
 Mariées mais pas trop (2003) (dir. Catherine Corsini) co-written with Catherine Corsini and Christophe Morand
 Nathalie... (2003) (dir. Anne Fontaine): original screenplay, under title: Nathalie Ribout
 La Femme de Gilles (2004) (dir. Frédéric Fonteyne) co-written with Marion Hänsel and Frédéric Fonteyne after novel by Belgian writer Madeleine Bourdouxhe - Joseph Plateau Award for Best Belgian Screenplay
 Irina Palm (2006) (dir. Sam Garbarski) co-written with Martin Herron
 Nuits d'Arabie (2007) (dir. Paul Kieffer) co-written with Paul Kieffer
 A Distant Neighborhood (2010) (dir. Sam Garbarski) co-written with Jérôme Tonerre, after original graphic novel by Jirô Taniguchi)
 The Assistant (2015)

Films (as director and writer)

Short films 
 W. C. (1991) 
 CHA CHA CHA (1998)
 MIREILLE ET LUCIEN with Aylin Yay and Serge Larivière (2001) 
Festivals : Clermont-Ferrand, Locarno, Valenciennes, Dresde, Cannes (La nuit la plus courte, Critic's week),…

Feature films 
Step by Step (An honest dealer aka Step by step) (2002) Official website
Featuring Benoît Verhaert, Philippe Noiret, Yolande Moreau, Serge Larivière 
Selected in Venice & Montreal Festivals
LA COULEUR DES MOTS (The colour of words) (2005) Official website
Selected in Montréal, Valladolid, Amiens, Namur, Sousse, Madrid, Brive, Moscow 
Best actress award for Aylin Yay & Signis Prize in Amiens
Best actress award for Aylin Yay & Audience award in Brive
COQUELICOTS (Red Poppies) (2007) Official website
Selected for festivals of : Valladolid, Amiens, Beauvais, Rouen, Mons, Moustier, UGC Fête de l’Europe, Rabat, Split, Mexico, Moncton, Namur, São Paulo
Maternelle (Motherly) (2009) Official website
Featuring Aylin Yay, Anne Girouard, Chloé Struvay, Nathalie Laroche, Cédric Juliens

Theatre

as writer 
 La Lettre des chats, Ed Lansman (1992)
 Apôtres
 Une chose intime
 Où es-tu Sammy Rebenski ?
 Jef
 Le Masque du dragon
 L'argent du ministre
 Les Mangeuses de chocolat, Ed Lansman (1996)
 L'Invisible, Ed Hayez-Lansman (2004)
 Une aventure de Simon Rapoport, guerrier de l'espace 
 Pitch 
 Une liaison pornographique, Actes Sud-Papiers, 2003 (suivi de Nathalie Ribout)
 Le Village oublié d'au-delà des montagnes
 Nathalie Ribout, Actes Sud-Papiers, 2003  
 Les témoins, Hayez-Lansman, 2005
 Paternel (2009)
 Fragile
 Après Anatole
 Le Jeu des cigognes et de l'enfer
 Rue du Croissant

as director 
 FILATURES – spectacle collectif
 LES SEPT JOURS DE SIMON LABROSSE de Carole FRÉCHETTE
 UNE CHOSE INTIME 
 JEF 
 PITCH
 LE MASQUE DU DRAGON
 LES MANGEUSES DE CHOCOLAT
 UNE AVENTURE DE SIMON RAPOPORT, GUERRIER DE L'ESPACE 
 Macbeth (à deux) based on Shakespeare's play
 LES MILLE ET UNE NUITS (One Thousand and One Nights)
 LES TEMOINS
 PATERNEL création en 2009 au Théâtre Le Public à Bruxelles

Awards

Won

 1990: Prix Rossel for De cendres et de fumées
 2005: The Joseph Plateau Award, Best Belgian Screenplay (Beste Belgische Scenario) for La Femme de Gilles (2004).
 2005: Signis Prize for LA COULEUR DES MOTS - Amiens Film Festival
 2005: Audience Award for LA COULEUR DES MOTS - Brive Film Festival
 2014: Magritte Award, Best Screenplay, for Tango libre (2012)

Nominated
 2002: Grand Prix des Amériques, for Step by Step (2002)
 2004: The Joseph Plateau Award, Best Belgian Screenplay, for Le Tango des Rashevski (2003)
 2012: Magritte Award, Best Screenplay, for Romantics Anonymous (2010)
 2014: Magritte Award, Best Screenplay, for Vijay and I (2013)

Bibliography
 Hennuy, Jean-Frédéric, L'Effet Blasband ou Le Regard Persan (New York etc., Peter Lang, 2011) (Belgian Francophone Library, 22).

References

External links
Official website 

Belgian writers in French
1964 births
Jewish writers
Living people
Magritte Award winners